Daryl Townsend (born September 25, 1985) is a former professional Canadian football defensive back for the Ottawa Redblacks of the Canadian Football League (CFL). He played CIS Football with the Windsor Lancers. Before his college career, Daryl played Cegep Div 1 (formerly 3A league) football for the Cougars at Champlain College in Lennoxville, Quebec, Canada.

Professional career
He was originally signed as undrafted free agent by the Saskatchewan Roughriders following the 2011 CFL Draft. He spent one week on their practice roster before being picked up by the Winnipeg Blue Bombers, playing in one game for the club. Soon after, he was signed by the Montreal Alouettes on October 6, 2011. He played for seven seasons for the Alouettes before he was released on May 10, 2018. He was signed by the Ottawa Redblacks on October 9, 2018.

References

External links
Ottawa Redblacks bio

1985 births
Living people
Canadian football defensive backs
Montreal Alouettes players
Ottawa Redblacks players
Players of Canadian football from Ontario
Saskatchewan Roughriders players
Sportspeople from Windsor, Ontario
Windsor Lancers football players
Winnipeg Blue Bombers players